A Dream Too Late was an alternative rock band from Albany, Oregon, United States. The group was signed to Tooth & Nail Records.

They released their debut album, Intermission to the Moon on November 6, 2007. In 2007 they also toured with Falling Up, Run Kid Run, The Send, and Ruth. Reviewers compared the group's sound to Falling Up and Shiny Toy Guns.

In 2008 they were let go by Tooth & Nail Records. The band recently on their MySpace that they have broken up and that previous members have created a new band called "Philadelphia". The Philadelphia project was active up until February 2011 releasing only one song.

Discography
Intermission to the Moon
 14th and Knott
 Do You Believe? (In Ghosts)
 Intermission to the Moon
 City Park
 Trendsetter
 The Life
 Can I Start a New?
 Be Honest
 Daylight
 Airsick
 A Night Polaris

References

External links
 Patrol Magazine Review of Intermission to the Moon

Musical groups established in 2007
American experimental rock groups
American Christian rock groups
Rock music groups from Oregon
Tooth & Nail Records artists
Culture of Albany, Oregon
2007 establishments in Oregon
2011 disestablishments in Oregon
Musical groups disestablished in 2011
Musical groups reestablished in 2017